The Rotec R3600 is a nine-cylinder radial engine built by Rotec Aerosport Pty Ltd in Australia. Initially released in 2005, it was a followup of the 7-cylinder Rotec R2800 released five years earlier. Both this engine and its smaller cousin have been frequently used as both replacement engines for vintage World War 1 aircraft, and reproduction aircraft from the same vintage. Some notable aircraft this engine has been used in are the Fokker Triplane, Sopwith Camel and the Nieuport 17.

Note that these engines are not limited to only aircraft applications, JRL Cycles has converted an R3600 for use in a motorcycle.

Applications
Applications include:
Airdrome Sopwith Camel
Avro 504K
BJJR Bulldog
Criquet Storch
Dehavilland DHC-1
Fokker DR1
Hatz Classic
Little Wing Autogyro
Nieuport 24
Nieuport 17
Polikarpov I-16
Samson Mite
Sopwith Camel
Van's RV-8R
Warner Revolution II
Zenith CH 200

Specifications (Rotec R3600)

See also
List of motorcycles by type of engine

References

Rotec R3600

External links
Rotec Aerosport
JRL Radial Motorcycle

Aircraft air-cooled radial piston engines
2000s aircraft piston engines